The Putuo Zongcheng Temple of Chengde, Hebei province, China is a Qing dynasty era Buddhist temple complex built between 1767 and 1771, during the reign of the Qianlong Emperor (1735–1796). It is located near the Chengde Mountain Resort, which is south of the Putuo Zongcheng. Along with the equally famed Puning Temple, it is one of the Eight Outer Temples of Chengde. The temple was modeled after the Potala Palace of Tibet, the residence of the Dalai Lama built a century earlier. Since it was modeled after the Potala palace, the temple represents a fusion of Chinese and Tibetan architectural styles. Many of its halls and pavilions are adorned with copper and gold tiled roofs, adding to the splendor of the site.

History

The Putuo Zongcheng Temple is part of the "Eight Outer Temples" located in Chengde, which are part of the World Heritage List along with the Chengde Mountain Resort. These temples were administered by the Lifan Yuan, an administrative department for the affairs of ethnic minorities such as the Mongolians and Tibetans, hence the different combinations of architectural style which could be seen throughout these Eight Outer Temples in Chengde.

The Putuo Zongcheng Temple was originally dedicated to the Qianlong Emperor to celebrate his birthday, as well as provide Hebei with a temple of equal size and splendor as the Potala Palace in Lhasa. The Putuo Zongcheng temple served more functions than just Buddhist ceremonies and festivals; it was also the location that the emperor would gather meetings of different ethnic envoys from within the empire. The location served as a peaceful getaway in contrast to the bustling life of the capital Beijing, as well as complimented the nearby hunting grounds that the emperor would enjoy with his guests.

As of 1994, the Chengde Mountain Resort and Chengde's Eight Outer Temples (including the Putuo Zongcheng Temple) were established as UNESCO World Heritage Sites. Today, the temple remains a site of tourism and local festivities.

Gates, halls, and towers

See also
List of Buddhist temples
Puning Temple
Xumi Fushou Temple

Notes

References
Foret, Philippe. (2000). Mapping Chengde: The Qing Landscape Enterprise. Honolulu: University of Hawaii Press.  (Paperback).
Rawski, Evelyn Sakakida. (1998). The Last Emperors: A Social History of Qing Imperial Institutions. Berkeley: University of California Press.  (Paperback).
 Montell, Gösta: The Lama Temple Potala of Jehol. Plan of the Monastery-Ground. In: Geografiska Annaler, Band 17, Supplement: Hyllningsskrift Tillagnad Sven Hedin (1935), S. 175-184. (Putuo Zongcheng Temple)
 Hedin, Sven and Bergman, Folke: History of the expedition in Asia 1927-1935, in: Reports from the scientific expedition to the north-western provinces of China under leadership of Dr. Sven Hedin. The Sino-Swedish expedition. Publication 24: Part II 1928–1933. Stockholm 1943-1945, page 121ff. and page 184ff.. See also: Sino-Swedish Expedition of Sven Hedin and the Century of Progress Exposition in Chicago 1933/1934 (German).
 Montell, Gösta, Hedin, Sven: The Chinese lama temple Potala of Jehol. Exhibition of historical and ethnographical collections. Made by Dr. Gösta Montell, member of Dr. Sven Hedin's Expeditions, and donated by Vincent Bendix. Chicago: Century of Progress Exposition 1932.

External links

Chengde at Archers Direct
Travel China Guide
World Heritage Virtual Tour (360 degree "panographic" view)
World Heritage Virtual Tour (360 degree "panographic" view; second view)

Religious buildings and structures completed in 1771
18th-century Buddhist temples
Buddhist temples in Hebei
Gelug monasteries and temples
World Heritage Sites in China
1767 establishments in China
Religious organizations established in the 1760s
Chengde
Qing dynasty architecture
Qianlong Emperor
Major National Historical and Cultural Sites in Hebei